Dinero ("Money" in Spanish) was a Colombian-based monthly business and magazine. Founded in 1993, was Colombia's first and foremost financial and business-news magazine regularly featuring corporate profiles, market trends, economic analyses, interviews and investigative reports.

References

1993 establishments in Colombia
Business magazines
Magazines published in Colombia
Magazines established in 1993
Mass media in Bogotá
Monthly magazines
Spanish-language magazines